Nassau Community College (NCC) is a public community college in Uniondale, New York. It was founded in 1959 and is part of the State University of New York.

History 

Nassau Community College was created as part of the State University of New York (SUNY) in 1959. When the college opened, on February 1, 1960, it had 632 students, and classes were held in an old courthouse. When Mitchel Air Force Base closed, the college obtained substantial property, including buildings to develop its new campus, on what is now known as Mitchel Field. (The government still retains some housing and other facilities in the vicinity of the Nassau campus.)

Academics 
Nassau Community College annually awards the largest number of Associate degrees in the State of New York and the third largest number of Associate degrees for a single campus two-year public colleges in the United States. The strongest programs at Nassau Community College are music, mathematics, physics, chemistry, engineering, civil engineering technology, electrical engineering technology, sound recording, and nursing.

NCC offers Associate of Arts degrees in liberal arts, focused on humanities and social sciences, specialized Associate of Arts and Associate of Science transfer degrees, and Associate of Arts and Science degrees and certificate programs designed to serve immediate employment goals of students.

The college operates an astronomical observatory for its students.

Notable alumni
 Bruce Arena, professional soccer manager
 Arjun Atwal, professional golfer
 Brian Baldinger, radio and TV pundit
 Phil Baroni, professional mixed martial artist
 Rich Borresen, professional football player
 Steve Buscemi, actor
 Billy Crystal, comedian
 Luke Cummo, professional mixed martial artist
 Patrick Day, professional boxer
 Tim Dillon, comedian
 Rasul Douglas, professional football player
 Jay Hieron, wrestler, mixed martial artist
 Al Iaquinta, wrestler; professional mixed martial artist
 Steve Israel, United States congressman
 Jesse Lacey, musician
 Josh Lafazan, Nassau County legislator
 Ryan LaFlare, wrestler; professional mixed martial artist
 Shep Messing, Olympic soccer player and broadcaster
 Lou Michel, author and journalist
 Rod Morgenstein, drummer
 John Moschitta, Jr., speed talker
 Eddie Murphy, actor and comedian
 Elliott Murphy, singer-songwriter and writer
 Bob Nelson, stand-up comedian
 Mark O'Connell, musician
 Michael Anthony Pegues, visual artist
 Michael Robinson, professional football player
 Zack Ryder (Matthew Cardona), professional wrestler
 Chris Weidman, New York State Collegiate Champion; professional mixed martial artist

References

External links 

 Official website

 
SUNY community colleges
Garden City, New York
Universities and colleges on Long Island
Educational institutions established in 1959
Universities and colleges in Nassau County, New York
NJCAA athletics
1959 establishments in New York (state)